Preston House may refer to:

Preston School of Industry, Ione, California, also known as Preston Castle and listed as the latter on the NRHP in Amador County,  California
Preston Farm (Fort Collins, Colorado), listed on the National Register of Historic Places in Larimer County, Colorado
Preston Bungalow, Paris, Idaho, listed on the NRHP in Bear Lake County, Idaho
Maj. Walter Preston House, Becknerville, Kentucky, listed on the NRHP in Clark County, Kentucky
 Preston House (Milton, Kentucky) on the National Register of Historic Places listings in Trimble County, Kentucky
Preston-on-the-Patuxent, Johnstown, Maryland, listed on the NRHP in Calvert County, Maryland
White-Preston House, Danvers, Massachusetts, listed on the NRHP in Essex County, Massachusetts
 Preston House (Thompson Falls, Montana) on the National Register of Historic Places listings in Sanders County, Montana
Stillwell-Preston House, Saddle River, New Jersey, listed on the NRHP in Bergen County, New Jersey
Charles Preston House, Seaside, Oregon, listed on the NRHP in Clatsop County, Oregon
Hampton-Preston House, Columbia, South Carolina, listed on the NRHP in Richland County, South Carolina
Preston Farm (Kingsport, Tennessee), listed on the National Register of Historic Places in Sullivan County, Tennessee
Thaddeus and Josepha Preston House, Paris, Texas, listed on the NRHP in Lamar County, Texas
Preston-Lafreniere Farm, Bolton, Vermont, listed on the National Register of Historic Places in Chittenden County, Vermont 
 Preston House (Marion, Virginia) on the National Register of Historic Places listings in Smyth County, Virginia
 Preston House (Salem, Virginia) on the National Register of Historic Places listings in Salem, Virginia
 Preston House (Saltville, Virginia) on the National Register of Historic Places listings in Smyth County, Virginia
Preston Community Clubhouse, Preston, Washington, listed on the NRHP in King County, Washington
Preston Hall (Waitsburg, Washington), listed on the NRHP in Walla Walla County, Washington

See also
Preston Hall (disambiguation)
Preston Farm (disambiguation)

Architectural disambiguation pages